Our Lady of Remedies or The Virgin of Los Remedios is a title of the Virgin Mary. 

It may refer to:
Church of los Remedios (Guadalajara), Spain
Church of Nuestra Señora de los Remedios (Estremera), Spain
Iglesia de Nuestra Señora de los Remedios, Cholula, Mexico
Nuestra Señora de los Remedios Parish, Philippines
Our Lady of Remedies Cathedral, Riohacha, Colombia
Festivities of Our Lady of the Remedies in Riohacha
Sanctuary of Nuestra Señora de los Remedios in Fuensanta, Spain
Santa Remedios Church, Northern Mariana Islands
Virgen de los Remedios de Pampanga, a title of Mary venerated by Kapampangan Catholics in the Philippines

See also
Los Remedios in Seville, Spain, named following a convent in the district
Los Remedios National Park, Mexico